Giriraj Singh (born 8 September 1952) is an Indian politician and the Minister of Rural Development and Panchayati Raj Department in the 23rd Ministry of the Republic of India with a cabinet minister rank. He is the Member of Parliament from the Begusarai Loksabha constituency in the 17th Lok Sabha. He has also formerly served as Minister of Cooperative, Animal Husbandry and Fisheries Resources Development in the Government of Bihar.

Personal life
Giriraj Singh was born in Barahiya town in Lakhisarai district of Bihar to Ramavtar Singh and Tara Devi. He graduated from Magadh University in 1971. He is married to Uma Sinha and has a daughter.

Political career
Singh served in the government of Bihar as Co-Operative Minister from 2005 to 2010 and as Animal Husbandry minister from 2010 to 2013. He has been a staunch supporter of Narendra Modi from the beginning. He publicly supported Modi for Prime Minister for a long time. He was among the eleven BJP ministers who were dismissed by Nitish Kumar as a result of breaking the JDU-BJP alliance. He was a member of the Bihar State Bharatiya Janata Party's 16-member state election committee and a State Minister (independent charge) of the "Ministry of Micro Small and Medium Enterprises ", MP from Nawada Constituency (2014 Indian General Election).

In May 2019, he became the Cabinet Minister of the newly formed Ministry of Animal Husbandry, Dairying and Fisheries after defeating CPI candidate Kanhaiya Kumar in the 2019 Indian general election.

In July 2021, he became Minister of Rural Development and Minister of Panchayati Raj in Second Modi ministry after the Cabinet reshuffle replacing Narendra Singh Tomar.

Positions held
2002 – May 2014: Member, Bihar Legislative Council
2005 – 2010: Cooperative Minister, Government of Bihar
2010 – 2013: Cabinet Minister, Animal Husbandry and Fisheries Resources Development, Government of Bihar
May 2014: Elected to 16th Lok Sabha
1 Sep 2014 – 9 November 2014: Member, Joint Committee on Salaries and Allowances of Members of Parliament.
Sep. 2014 – 9 November 2014: Member, Standing Committee on Labour
9 November 2014: Union Minister of State, Ministry of Micro, Small and Medium Enterprises
4 September 2017: Union Minister of State (Independent Charge) Ministry of Micro, Small and Medium Enterprises
30 May 2019: Cabinet Minister of Ministry of Animal Husbandry, Dairying and Fisheries.

References

External links

 

|-

|-

|-

|-

1952 births
Living people
Bharatiya Janata Party politicians from Bihar
People from Bihar
India MPs 2014–2019
People from Lakhisarai district
People from Nawada district
Lok Sabha members from Bihar
Narendra Modi ministry
Far-right politicians in India
India MPs 2019–present
Magadh University alumni